Onze Kunst van Heden (Contemporary Artists/Our Art of Today) was an exhibition held in the winter of 1939 through 1940 at the Rijksmuseum in Amsterdam. Due to the threat of invasion in the years leading up to World War II, the Netherlands' government stored many items from the Rijksmuseum's permanent collection. The resulting empty gallery space was utilized by contemporary Dutch artists to exhibit and sell their art. It was organized by the director of the Rijksmuseum . The show was open to all artists, with each artist allowed to enter four pieces.  902 artists exhibited 3,200 works of art in 74 rooms and cabinets of the Rijksmuseum.

Artists exhibited at Onze Kunst van Heden
Artists included in the exhibition as listed in ARTindex Lexicon Online

A

 Jean Adams (Johann Hubert Adams)
 Marinus Adamse
Christiaan Johannes Addicks
Johan P. Aerts 
 Henk Albers

 Gerrit Alozerij
Jan Altink

Thérèse Ansingh
 Albert Arens

B

 Frans Backmund

 Jan Bakker
 Teun Bakker
 Jan Bander (Jan Cornelis Bander)
 Léonie Bander - Lutomirski
 Bets Bayens - Polak

Bella van Beek-Stroeve
 Theo Beerendonk

 Di Behrens
 Chris Bekker Jr.

Truus Pannekoek-van Bemmel

 Jo Bezaan
Herman Bieling
 Marinus Bies
 Leonora van Bijsterveld

 Marinus Blanke
 Tjieke Bleckmann

 Laurens Bleeker
 Miek Bloemen
 M.C. Boas - Zélander
 Felicien Bobeldijk
 Jac Bodaan
Nelly Bodenheim
 W.F. Boekstal

 Wilhelmus de Boer

Herman Bogman (jr.)
 Piet Böhncke
Rie de Balbian Verster-Bolderhey
Cees Bolding
 Han Bolte

 Berend Bongers
 Jantjen Bontkes
 Herman van den Boogaard
 Alex Boom (Karel Alexander August Jan Boom)
 Jan Boon
Henri Frédéric Boot
 Han Boskamp

 Jaap Bouhuijs (Jaap Bouhuys)
Jo Bouman
 Gerard Bourgonjon
 Gesina Bouvé
 G.E. Bouwmeester
Anna Maria Braakensiek-Dekker

Maaike Braat-Rolvink 
 Chiel Brandenburg
 Bert Brante

 E.T. van Briel
 Elga Broeckman (Elga Eymer)
Adriënne Broeckman-Klinkhamer
 L.M. Broeckman - van Zijdveld
Anne Marinus Broeckman
 Hetty Broedelet - Henkes

Edmée Broers
 Louis Bron

 Fred Brouwer
 I.A. Brouwer
 Robert Ives Browne

Annie Bruin

 M.A.H. van der Burg
Dirk Bus
 Johan Busé
 Meindert Butter

C

Mies Callenfels-Carsten
 Louis Cardinaals

 Jacques Chapchal
Paul Citroen
 Joop Coenders
 Pie Coenen
Mozes Cohen
 Willem van der Colk

Ko Cossaar
 Cornelis Cox
Marie Cremers
Jos Croin

D

 Kreel Daamen
Max van Dam
 Wim van Dam
Lucie van Dam van Isselt
 J.J. Damme

Rachel van Dantzig
 Arnold Davids
 Mies Deinum

 Alex Dieperink
 H.B. Dieperink Jzn.

 W.J. Dijk

 Waalko Dingemans
Maria Helena Disselhoff
Marinus Dittlinger
Jacobus Doeser 
 Elise Dom
 Jan Dona
Jan Adriaan Donker Duyvis,
Claudine Doorman
 Tini van Doornik

 Willem Dooyewaard
Leopold Herman Daniël van Dorp
 Willem van Dort Sr.

 Gerard Drost
Gerrit van Duffelen
 Jacob van Duijne

 W.F. Dupont
Debora Duyvis
Lize Duyvis

E

 Geurt van Eck
 Willem van Eck
Nicolas Eekman
Stien Eelsingh
 Henri Eernink
 Henk van Eeuwijk sr
Piet van Egmond
 Antje Egter van Wissekerke
 P.B.M. van den Eijnde
 Willem Eitjes
Dick Elffers
 Rieks Elings

 Fred Engel

 Jac Eriks
 Johan Eshuis
Bernard Essers

 Frans Everbag
 Jan Everts
 Dirk den Exter
Charles Eyck

F

Johann Faber
Marie Madeleine De Famars Testas

 Albert Fiks

 Willy Fleur

 Adriana Fontein

 Jan Franken
Marianne Franken

Roel Frankot
 Gerrit Frederiks

G

Salomon Garf
Coenraad Garms
 Jan van Geem

Hendrika van Gelder
 Rebecca van Gelder

Ed Gerdes
Huub Gerretsen

 C. Gerritsen
Jan Jacob Gerstel

Julia Giesberts
Agnieta Gijswijt

 Willem Giltay
 Paul Gimbel
 Lizzy Goddard
Nelly Goedewaagen
Jan Goedhart
Andries Johannes Jacobus van Gool
 Jos Gosschalk
Móric Góth
Sárika Góth
Helena Elisabeth Goudeket

Gerrit David Gratama
Lina Gratama
Janneke Anette de Grave

 Jos Grieken
 J.P. Griep
 Berend Groeneveld
 Theo Groeneveld
 Jac Groot
 T.L.M. de Groot

H

 T. Haanebrink

Dirk van Haaren
Willem Frederik Haas
 Wim de Haas
 Herman Habes
 Jan Habets
 J.G. van Haersolte - de Lange
Hendrik Anton Hage

 Jan van Ham

 Willem Hamel
 Flip Hamers

 Nita Hannema
Otto Hanrath

 Anna van Harinxma thoe Slooten
 Dirk Harting
 Marianne Hartong

Nola Hatterman
 Jacobus Haver Droeze
 Jan van Heel
 Simon de Heer
Annie van der Heide-Hemsing
 Reinier Heiloo
 Wim Heinecke

Johan van Hell
Eduard Hellendoorn

 Johan Hemkes
Alida Sophia Hendriks
 Arend Hendriks
 Meindert Hendriks
Johann Wilhelm Henke
 Hendrik Henrichs

Jan Andries Herfst 
Felix Hess
Johannes Albertus Hesterman Jr.
Roeloffina van Heteren-Vink
Geertruida van Hettinga Tromp
 Herman Heuff
 Johannes Heuperman
 B.J. van Heusden
Folke Heybroek
Herman Heijenbrock
Marinus Heijnes

 Jan Hingman
Jemmy van Hoboken
Jacobus H. Hoenderdos

Antoinette van Hoytema
 Charles Hollman
Louise van Holthe tot Echten
 Dirk Homberg
Tine Honig
Ina Hooft
Bernard de Hoog
 Hendrik de Hoog
Maria Ida Adriana Hoogendijk
Douwe Mattheus Hoogeveen
Jan Hendrik Hoowij
 Elbert Hooyberg

 Gé ter Horst
 Eduard Houbolt
Alida van Houten
 Chiem van Houweninge (1898 1996)
 Albert Hovenkamp
 Frits Hubeek
Henriette Hubregtse-Lanzing
 Jan Hul
 Mathieu Hul

Albertus Gerhard Hulshoff Pol 

 A.E. van Humalda van Eysinga (Jhr)
 Frieda Hunziker 
Vilmos Huszár
Cornelis Teunis Huussen
 Dorothée Huysinga
 Gerard Huysser

I

Hendrikus IJkelenstam
Cees van Ijsseldijk
Jacques Ijsselmuiden
 Jan Ingenhoes

J

Mirjam Jacobson
 Jan Jans
 Co Jansen
 E.A. Jansen

 Lambert Jansen

 H.J. Jansen van Galen
 J.A.H. Jaspers
 Everhard Jekel
Samuel Jessurun de Mesquita
Johannes Antonius Fredericus Joghems

Germ de Jong
 Gerrit de Jong

Johanna Alida Catharina de Jonge
Marie de Jonge
 Roelf Jongman
 Jan Jordens
Johannes Hendricus Jurres

K

 Jaap Kaal
Dorry Kahn-Weyl
Harm Kamerlingh Onnes
Johan Bernard Kamp

Otto B. de Kat
Henriette Agnete Kitty von Kaulbach
Lucie Keijser
 Antony Keizer
 Marie Kelting
Bernard Johan Kerkhof 
 Gerard Kerkhoff

 Adriaan Keus
 Jan Kijff
 Marie Kilsdonk

Nel Klaassen

Frits Klein
Jan Kleintjes
 Willem Klijn

 Piet Kloes
Cornelis Kloos
 Nicolaas Kluijver
Nel Kluitman

Josina Knap 

Rie Knipscheer
Olga van Iterson-Knoepfle
 Elize Knuttel

 Kobus Koeman
 Willem Koerse
 Willem de Kok
 Mark Kolthoff
 Douwe Komter
 Cornelis Koning
 Dirk Koning
Edzard Koning
 Roeland Koning
 Ulco Kooistra
 Lody van Kooten Jr.
Cornelis Koppenol

Jo Koster

 Mijndert Krijnsen
Johannes Jacobus Kroon 
 Gerard Kroone
Hildo Krop
Han Krug
 Louis Krüger
 Dirk Kruizinga
Johan Alexander Kruseman
Frederik Adolf Krüsmann
Harrie Kuyten

 Giselle Kuster
 Cornel Kwint

L

 Jan Lamberts

Anna Clasina Op 't Land
 Daan de Lange
Jan Bernaard de Lange
 Ger Langeweg
Sara Ledeboer 
Coba van der Lee
 Arie Leeflang
E.C. Leegstra

 Cornelis de Leeuw
 Dirk de Leeuw
 Cor van Leeuwen
 Henk van Leeuwen
Marinus Willem Gustus Leeuwen
 Willem van Leeuwen
Anna Lehmann

Henriëtte Johanna van Lent-Gort
 Johannes Leopold

Hubert Levigne
 Willem van Lierop
Johan van der Linde (jr.)

 Alfred Löb
 Jan Lodeizen
Lou Loeber
Josephus Bernardus Antonius Lohman
 Theo Lohmann

 Gerrit Lulof
Huib Luns

Ans Luttge-Deetman

M

Henri MacLean
 Harry Maas
Marie Henry Mackenzie
 Karin Mader
 J.C.F.H. Magendans
 Jan Henri Makkink
Kees Maks
 Adrianus Marchal
Mien Marchant
Henriëtte Marcus
 Jacques Maris
Gijsbert George Martens
Arend Jan Massink

Herman Mees

Sal Meijer
 Tom Meijer
Frederika Wilhelmina Christina Teding van Berkhout-de Meijere
Frans Meijers
 Louis Meijs
Mattheus Carel August Meischke
 Henk Melgers
Cornelis Mension

 Antonia ter Meulen

Jan Anthony Adriaan (Jan) van Meurs
Arie van Mever
 Pierre Michel
Judy Michiels van Kessenich 
Johan Miedema 

Adrianus Miolée 
 Charles Moen
Ro Mogendorff
 Toon van der Molen
 Tijmen Moll
Johannes Abraham Mondt
François Albertinus Mooy 
 Chris Moret

Pauline Johanna Gesine Mouthaan
 Toon van den Muijsenberg
Albert Mulder
Jan Mulder (1895-1988)
 Wim Mulder
Bertha Müller (1883-1968)

N

 Isaäc Naarden

Dirk Berend Nanninga
 Mien Nanninga
Max Nauta

Arnold Bernard Neujean
Jacqueline Marguerite van Nie

Leonardus Josephus Niehorster
Carl Cornelis van Niekerk
Willem van Nieuwenhoven (1879-1973) 
Gustaaf van Nifterik
Johan Christiaan Nijlandrkd
Suzanne Nijs

Henriëtte Gesina Numans

O

 Elisabeth Obreen

 Otto ten Oever
 Albert Oger
Suze Oosterhuis-van der Stok
 Henri van Os Delhez
Betsy Westendorp-Osieck
 Tames Oud
 Jan Ouwersloot
Coen van Oven

P

Corrie Pabst
 Hanny Paehlig
Abraham Arnoldus Pakkoo
Ru Paré
 Jan Peeters (1912 - 1992)

 Jan Pennings
Henriëtte Pessers
 Lukas Peterich

Adri Pieck
Johanna Pieneman
Johannes Antonius Pietersen
 Reinier Pijnenburg

 Leonard Pinkhof

 Toon Pluymers
Femmetje Marijke Poel
Henk Poesiat
 Christiaan Pointl
 Arend van de Pol
Hugo Polderman (1886 - 1977) 

 Jan Ponstijn

 Justin van de Port
Charlotte Pothuis
 Ko Prange
 Claas Prins

Maria Pronk-Rompelman

R

Marinus van Raalte
 Willem Rädecker
Cecilia Maria Elisabeth de Ranitz
Johan Bernhard Ludwig Reelfs
Etie van Rees
Koen van Rees
Willem Karel Rees 

 Piet de Regt
Marie van Regteren Altena

Henriëtte Johanna Reuchlin-Lucardie
Theo van Reijn
Piet Rezelman

 Ietske Richters

 Theo Riegstra
 Jan Rijlaarsdam

Coba Ritsema
Henri Ritzen

Willem Elisa Roelofs (1874-1940)
Johannes Cornelis Gerardus A. Roest
Cornelis Rol
 Herman Romijn
Bethijl Philippus van Romondt

 Dorus Roovers
 Lize Rose
 Suze Rosse
Jos Rovers

Hans Royaards (1902-1975) 

Gra Rueb

Alida Henriëtte Runeman

S

 Saraochim Salim
Henri Savrij

Gerbrand Frederik van Schagen

Frits Schiller
 Marinus Schipper
Carl Eberhard Schlüter
Willy Van Schoonhoven Van Beurden

Lizzy Schouten
Wout Schram
Louis Schrikkel

David Schulman

Bertha thoe Schwartzenberg
Maria Adeline Alice Schweistal
Jos Seckel
Adrianus Wilhelmus Selhorst
 Henri Sicking
 Willem Siedenburg
William Henry Singer

Suze Slager-Velsen
 Viry Slijper
Gerardus Hermanus Johannes Sluijter
Willy Sluiter
Anton Smeerdijk
Alberta Johanna Meijer-Smetz
Elisabeth Bol-Smit
 Ineke Smit
 Jan Smit Kzn
Hobbe Smith
 Johan Smith (1900-1958)
 C.P. Snijders b. 1904
 Andree de Sobocka
Christiaan Soer (1882-1961)
 Leonida Sologaub
 Truus van Someren Gréve

Johan Spaling (1891-1974)
Frederika Springer
 Ludwig Stainer
Henri Johan van der Stal
 Jacq Stal
 G.J. Staller
Arend van Starrenburg

 Cephas Stauthamer
 Louis van der Steen
Jan Jelmer Steenhuis (1897-1983)
Wim Steijn
Johann von Stein 
Marie van Waning-Stevels
 Koos Stikvoort

 Theo Stiphout
 Charles Stok
 Hans van der Stok
 Agnes van Stolk
 Sara van Stolk
Heinrich Wilhelm Christian Stolle 
 Corry Stolp
Barend Hendrik Stomps
 Pierre Stordiau
 Michiel Straasheijm
 B. Straithon - van Gelder
Theo Swagemakers

T

 Jan Tebben
 Josefa Tepe
 Carl Thoenies
 Jan Tiele
George Tielens
Kees Timmer
 Adriaan Timmers
 Frans Timmers

 Ersika Tóth
Jelle Troelstra

V

Johan Laurent ter Veer
Jacobus Marinus Augustinus Veerman
 Paul van der Ven

Johannes Nicolaas Anthonius Vergeer
Margaretha C. Verheus
 Josef Verheyen (1899 - 1976)

 Jan Veringa (1907 - 1982) 

Leonard Pieter Versteeg
 Henri Verstijnen
Johanna Helena Viertelhausen
 Dirk  Vis
 Heyme Vis
 Reinder Visscher
 Jan Visser
Tjipke Visser
Tula Marina di Vista
 Gerard van  Vliet
Tilly Münninghoff-van Vliet

Koos van Vlijmen
 Leendert de Vogel
 Adrianus Volkers
 Maurice Volkhemer
 Dirk Volz
 Gerard Voogd
 Kees de Voogt

 Henri Vos
Jo Voskuil
 Jeroen Voskuyl
Cornelis Vreedenburgh
 Herman Vreedenburgh
 Martinus Vreugde
Hendrik de Vries
Johan Marinus de Vries (1892-1982)

W

 Leo van Waegeningh

Hendrik Adriaan van der Wal
Petrus Marinus van Walcheren

 Ben Walrecht

Willem Abraham Wassenaar
Catharina Elisabeth Wassink
Gisèle d'Ailly van Waterschoot van der Gracht

Hendrik Weegewijs
Barend Hendrik Ter Weeme
 Theo ter Weeme

Jaap Weyand

Clara Adriana van der Werff
Wouter Marinus van de Werk (1875-1969)
Hendrik Nicolaas Werkman

Hendrik Jan Wesseling
Hendrik Jacobus Westendorp
Gerhard Westermann
Johannes Embrosius van de Wetering de Rooij
Berend Wolter Weyers
Jan Wiegers

 Joub Wiertz
Louis Frederik Wijmans
Wilhelmus Lambertus Wijmans

Marie Willeboordse
Wilhelmus Antonius Willemsen
 Karl Willerding

 Jos Wins
 Willem Witjens
 Jan Wittenberg (artist)

Hendrik Jan Wolter
 Gerrit Woudt

Elsa Woutersen-van Doesburgh
Gonda Wulfse

Z

 Ed van Zanden

 Janus van  Zeegen jr.
Agatha Zethraeus
 Louis de Zwart

 Jac Zwijsen

References

Exhibitions in the Netherlands
Art in Amsterdam
Rijksmuseum Amsterdam
1939 in art